Melvin is a given name and surname. It may also refer to:

Places

United States
 Melvin, Alabama, an unincorporated community
 Melvin, California, a former unincorporated community
 Melvin, Illinois, a village
 Melvin, Iowa, a city
 Melvin, Kentucky, an unincorporated community
 Melvin, Michigan, a village
 Melvin Village, New Hampshire, a village and census-designated place
 Melvin, Ohio, an unincorporated community
 Melvin, South Dakota, a ghost town
 Melvin, Texas, a town
 Melvin River, New Hampshire

Elsewhere
 Lough Melvin, a lake on the border between the Republic of Ireland and Great Britain

Other uses
 , a United States Navy destroyer
 , a United States Navy destroyer
 Melvins, an American rock band
 Melvins! (album) (1986)
 Melvin Capital, an American investment management firm
 "Two Guys Naked in a Hot Tub", an episode of South Park also known as "Melvins"
 The "Melvin", the national Scoutcraft Competition of Scouting Ireland (CSI)
 A "melvin," a frontal variation of a wedgie.